James Rupert Naden (13 July 1889 – 14 June 1963) was an English first-class cricketer. He was a right-handed batsman and right arm fast bowler who played two first-class games for Worcestershire in midsummer 1922.

He took his only two wickets (those of George Collins and Bill Ashdown) on debut against Kent, but that was in a Kent innings of 509/6 declared, and Worcestershire were demolished by an innings and 234 runs. In his other first-class game, against Gloucestershire two weeks later, he did not take a wicket.

Naden was born in Tipton (which was then in Staffordshire); he died at the age of 73 in Turls Hill, Sedgley (also at the time in Staffordshire).

External links
 

1889 births
1963 deaths
English cricketers
Worcestershire cricketers
People from Sedgley
Sportspeople from Tipton